Stilbaceae is a family of flowering plants in the order Lamiales.

Genera include:
Anastrabe  E. Mey. ex Benth. 
Bowkeria Harv. 
Campylostachys Kunth  
Charadrophila Marloth 
Euthystachys A. DC.  
Halleria L.  
Ixianthes Benth. 
Kogelbergia Rourke
Nuxia Comm. ex Lam. 
Retzia Thunb. 
Stilbe P. J. Bergius 
Thesmophora Rourke

References

 
Lamiales families